The men's singles of the 2005 ECM Prague Open tournament was played on clay in Prague, Czech Republic. 

Jan Hernych successfully defended his title, by defeating Jiří Vaněk 3–6, 6–4, 6–3 in the final.

Seeds

Draw

Finals

Top half

Bottom half

References

External links
 ITF tournament profile
 Main Draw (ATP)
 Qualifying Draw (ATP)

2005 Men's Singles